"This Is It" is a song by American musician Kenny Loggins. It was released in 1979 as the lead single from his 1979 album Keep the Fire. It reached number 11 on the Billboard Hot 100 and number 17 on the Adult Contemporary chart.  "This Is It" was also successful on the Hot Soul Singles chart, reaching number 19; it was one of two entries on this chart.

The song features additional vocals by Michael McDonald, who co-wrote the song with Loggins. The song won a Grammy Award in 1981 for Best Male Pop Vocal Performance.

NBC Sports used the song as theme music for its coverage of the NCAA men's basketball tournament in 1980 and 1981.

WPVI-TV in Philadelphia had a local weekend program of the same name and had the song as its theme throughout the 1980s.

Background and writing

At one point in the song's evolution, its melody was underway, but the lyrics were incomplete. Loggins moved it forward after a visit to his ailing father, who had undergone a series of surgeries for vascular problems stemming from small strokes and was discouraged at the prospect of another. His perspective on the lyrics then changed: I've got it,' I announced to Michael, "it's not a love song. It's a life song."

Chart performance

Weekly charts

Year-end charts

References

External links
 

1979 singles
1979 songs
Kenny Loggins songs
Songs written by Kenny Loggins
Songs written by Michael McDonald (musician)
Columbia Records singles
Grammy Award for Best Male Pop Vocal Performance
Song recordings produced by Tom Dowd